Queen Komal of Nepal (born 18 February 1951) is the wife of former King Gyanendra of Nepal. She was the last Queen consort of Nepal before the monarchy was abolished on 28 May 2008.

Life
Komal was born in Bagmati, Kathmandu into the Rana family, the daughter of Kendra Shumsher Jang Bahadur Rana (1927–1982) and his wife Shree Rajya Lakshmi Devi Shah (1928–2005). Komal's older sister Aishwarya was married to King Birendra of Nepal, the brother of Gyanendra. Aishwarya was killed in the palace massacre on 1 June 2001. Komal sustained bullet injuries as a result of the palace shooting and spent four weeks recovering in hospital.

She was educated at St Mary's School, Jawalakhel, St Helen's Convent, Kurseong, India and Kalanidhi Sangeet Mahavidhyalaya, Kathmandu.

As a result of the massacre, Komal's husband Gyanendra succeeded to the throne following the deaths of King Birendra, Crown Prince Dipendra (who had briefly succeeded him), and Prince Nirajan. Komal thus became Queen of Nepal.

Komal's younger sister Prekshya also married into the Shah dynasty marrying Gyanendra and Birendra's brother Prince Dhirendra who was killed in the palace massacre. They divorced in 1991. Princess Prekshya was killed in a helicopter crash on 12 November 2001.

Queen Komal married her second cousin Prince Gyanendra of Nepal on 1 May 1970 in Kathmandu. They have two children:
 Paras Shah (born on 30 December 1971 in Kathmandu)
 Prerana Shah Singh (born on 20 February 1978 in Kathmandu).

Abolition of the monarchy
The Nepalese Parliament voted on 28 December 2007 as part of a peace deal with former Maoist rebels, 270-3 in favour of abolishing the monarchy.

On 28 May 2008, the monarchy was officially abolished, replaced by a secular federal republic.

Patronages 
 Member of the Raj Sabha (1977).
 Patron Association of St Mary's Alumnae Nepal.
 Chairman of the Pashupati Area Development Trust (PADT).
 President of the SOS Children's Villages-Nepal (2001).

Honours
National

  Member of Order of Gorkha Right Arm (1975)
  Member of the Order of Rama Mantra Power (1980)
  Member of the Order of Three Divine Powers (1998)
  Member of the Order of Honour (17 October 2001)
  Member of the Order of the Benevolent Ruler (7 April 2004)
 Recipient of the Vishesh Seva Medal (Distinguished Service Medal, 1971)
  Recipient of the King Birendra Investiture Medal (24 February 1975)
  Recipient of the Commemorative Silver Jubilee Medal of King Birendra (31 January 1997)
 Recipient of the Vishista Seva Medal (Distinguished Service Medal, 1999)
  Recipient of the King Gyanendra Investiture Medal (4 June 2001)
 Most Glorious Mahendra Chain
Foreign
 : Dame Grand Cordon of the Order of the White Elephant (1979)
 : Dame Grand Cross of the National Order of Merit (2 May 1983)
 : Dame Grand Cross of the Order of Isabella the Catholic (13 November 1987)

Royal Titles

References

1951 births
Living people
Shooting survivors
Nepalese queens consort
Dames Grand Cross of the Order of Isabella the Catholic
Grand Cross of the Ordre national du Mérite
Members of the Order of Gorkha Dakshina Bahu, First Class
Members of the Order of Tri Shakti Patta, First Class
People of the Nepalese Civil War
21st-century Nepalese nobility
Nepalese Hindus
Women shooting survivors